Liberty Township is the name of some places in the U.S. state of Pennsylvania:

Liberty Township, Adams County, Pennsylvania
Liberty Township, Allegheny County, Pennsylvania, a former township annexed by Pittsburgh
Liberty Township, Bedford County, Pennsylvania
Liberty Township, Centre County, Pennsylvania
Liberty Township, McKean County, Pennsylvania
Liberty Township, Mercer County, Pennsylvania
Liberty Township, Montour County, Pennsylvania
Liberty Township, Susquehanna County, Pennsylvania
Liberty Township, Tioga County, Pennsylvania

Pennsylvania township disambiguation pages